What's Love Got to Do with It may refer to:

Tina Turner:
"What's Love Got to Do with It" (song), a 1984 song by Tina Turner
What's Love Got to Do with It (1993 film), a biographical film about Tina Turner
What's Love Got to Do with It (album), the soundtrack album for the film
What's Love Got to Do with It? (2022 film), an upcoming British romantic comedy
"What's Love Got to Do with It" (Warren G song), a 1996 single by Warren G and Adina Howard
"What's Love Got to Do with It?", an episode of ReBoot
"What's Love Got to Do with It?", an episode of All Grown Up!